Peter Allen (born March 6, 1970) is a Canadian former ice hockey defenceman.

Born in Calgary, Alberta, Allen was taken in the 1991 NHL Supplemental Draft by the Boston Bruins from Yale University.  After graduation in 1993, he had a spell with the Canadian National Team before spells in the East Coast Hockey League with the Richmond Renegades and in the American Hockey League for the Prince Edward Island Senators.  Another spell with Team Canada followed, including in the 1995 World Ice Hockey Championships, winning a bronze medal.  Afterwards he signed with the Pittsburgh Penguins as a free agent and played eight games for them during the 1995-96 NHL season but failed to register a point.  He spent much of his tenure with the International Hockey League's Cleveland Lumberjacks.  In 1997, Allen signed with the San Jose Sharks, but was assigned to the AHL's Kentucky Thoroughblades and never played for San Jose.  Allen then represented his country again in 2000 World Championships, but played just one game as Canada left empty-handed, losing to Finland in the bronze medal match.  Afterwards, Allen played in the European league, beginning with a spell in the Swiss Nationalliga B with EHC Chur.  He then had spells in Germany's Deutsche Eishockey Liga for the Schwenninger Wild Wings and in the German 2. Bundesliga for EC Bad Nauheim before retiring in 2004.

Career statistics

International statistics

Transactions
On June 2, 1991 the Boston Bruins selected Peter Allen in the first-round (#24 overall) of the 1991 NHL supplemental draft.
On August 10, 1995 the Pittsburgh Penguins signed free agent Peter Allen.
On August 15, 1997 the San Jose Sharks signed unrestricted free agent Peter Allen.
On September 16, 1999 the Vancouver Canucks released Peter Allen.

External links

1970 births
Living people
Boston Bruins draft picks
Canadian ice hockey defencemen
Cleveland Lumberjacks players
Ice hockey people from Calgary
Kentucky Thoroughblades players
National Hockey League supplemental draft picks
Pittsburgh Penguins players
Prince Edward Island Senators players
Richmond Renegades players
Schwenninger Wild Wings players
Yale Bulldogs men's ice hockey players
Canadian expatriate ice hockey players in Germany